Journal of European Social Policy is a peer-reviewed academic journal published five times a year by SAGE Publications. Its articles are in the field of Political sciences, this journal was established in 1991, and on its content approaches a wide range of social policy issues including ageing, pensions and social security, poverty and social exclusion, education, training and labour market policies, family policies, health and social care services, gender, migration, privatisation and Europeanisation.

Scope 
The Journal of European Social policy publishes articles on all aspects of Social Policy. The journal seeks articles which deal with issues such as ageing, pensions and social security. The Journal of European Social Policy is a quarterly published journal which is edited by Janine Leschke (Copenhagen Business School), Emmanuele Pavolini (University of Macerata) and Martin Seeleib-Kaiser (Eberhard Karls Universität Tübingen).

Abstracting and indexing 
Journal of European Social Policy is abstracted and indexed in Scopus, and the Social Sciences Citation Index. According to the Journal Citation Reports, its 2020 impact factor is 3.063.

References

External links
 

Political science journals
SAGE Publishing academic journals
5 times per year journals